Skadovsk (translit. Skadovs’k,) is a port city on the Black Sea in the Kherson Oblast of southern Ukraine. It is the administrative center of Skadovsk Raion and hosts the administration of the Skadovsk urban hromada, one of the hromadas of Ukraine. The city had a population of 

Skadovsk has a seaport. The closest railway station is Kalanchak,  from Skadovsk.

History 

The town was founded in 1894 by Sergey B. Skadovsky, a hydrobiologist and biochemist who was also a member of the State Council of the Taurida Governorate during the Russian Empire.

The town was originally a seaport for sending wheat, wool and furs to France, Germany and other European countries. The initial territory consisted of the Tatar fishing village Ali-Agok (Tatar for "quiet harbor") and the lands owned by Skadovsky. He and his wife are buried in Skadovsk.

During World War II, the town was occupied by Germany. The Germans operated a Nazi prison in the town.

2022 Russian invasion of Ukraine

During the Russian invasion of Ukraine, Russian armed forces entered Skadovksk on March 9, 2022. Within minutes after Russian equipment had entered the city, residents of the city came out to a rally with Ukrainian flags and called on the occupying forces to get out. On 12 March, the city's mayor declared that the Russian invaders had left the city. On 13 March, Russian troops again entered the city and deployed at a children camp on the outskirts of the city.

On 16 March, Skadovsk's mayor, Oleksandr Yakovlev, was detained by the Russian military. According to the Ukrainian news outlet Ukrayinska Pravda, on the same day of Yakovlev's detention, a peaceful rally demanding his release was held. It was claimed that Russian troops used tear gas and opened fire to disperse the rally. Ukrayinska Pravda had no information about victims. On 15 April, 2022, Russian forces removed the flag of Ukraine from the Skadovsk town hall and replaced it with a Russian flag.

Tourism 
Skadovsk is a tourist destination for people in Ukraine, Russia, Belarus, and Poland. It is located on the Dazharylhach Bay across from Dzharylhach Island.

In 2009, leading up to the Ukrainian presidential election, organizers of the Black Sea Games in Skadovsk presented Prime Minister Yulia Tymoshenko with a Bengal albino tigress named Tiger-Yulia. Tymoshenko eventually lost the elections.

Transport 

The city has a small port with a few piers. Additionally there are more piers located in the village of Khorly in the eastern portion of the Dzharylhach Bay. However, the piers of Khorly are not in an operational condition. The port of Skadovsk also administers a smaller port in Henichesk, located by the Sea of Azov.

Gallery

References

External links 

 
Cities in Kherson Oblast
Seaside resorts in Ukraine
Port cities and towns in Ukraine
Port cities of the Black Sea
Cities of district significance in Ukraine
Populated places established in 1894
Populated places established in the Russian Empire
Spa towns in Ukraine